The Funky Headhunter is the fifth studio album by Hammer, released on March 1, 1994, via Giant Records and Reprise Records.

The album at the time was hailed as Hammer's comeback album. As with some earlier songs such as "Crime Story" (from the album Please Hammer Don't Hurt 'Em), the content and reality about "street life" remained somewhat the same, but the sound was different, resulting in Hammer losing favor with fans. Nonetheless, the record was eventually certified platinum.

Album history 
Hammer debuted the album and video for "Pumps and a Bump" two months before its release on The Arsenio Hall Show and finally released it in March. Talk show host Arsenio Hall said to Hammer, "Women in the audience want to know, what's in your speedos in the 'Pumps and a Bump' video?" A clip from the video was then shown, to much approval from the audience. Hammer didn't give a direct answer but instead laughed. Arsenio then said, "I guess that's why they call you 'Hammer.' It ain't got nothin' to do with Hank Aaron" (which refers to the fact that Hammer was nicknamed after Aaron).

"Pumps and a Bump" proved to be a controversial track on this album, somewhat affecting Hammer's image. However, the single peaked at number three on the US Rap charts. It was banned from heavy rotation on MTV with censors claiming that the depiction of Hammer in Speedos (and with what appeared to be an erection) was too graphic. This led to an alternative video being filmed (with Hammer fully clothed) that was directed by Bay Area native Craig S. Brooks.

"It's All Good", produced by The Whole 9, was the second single released on this album, and peaked on the record charts as follows: US number 46, US R&B number 14, US Rap number 3 and UK number 52.

This album peaked at number two on the R&B charts and remained in the Top 30 midway through the year. The album eventually reached number 12 on the Billboard 200 chart The album managed to become certified platinum.

Critical reception 

AllMusic writer Ron Wynn said about the album overall: "Hammer's sound was leaner, his rapping tougher and more fluid, and his subject matter harder and less humorous." In a review for Vibe, contributor Charles Aaron called it "one of the most stunning curios of pop marketing hubris ever perpetrated", criticizing Hammer's half-hearted attempts at dissing other rappers, and the tracks for utilizing the overused G-funk sound and lacking lyrical substance or even "a nifty turn of phrase."

Track listing
Information taken from Amazon.com, Apple Music and Spotify.

Samples
Break 'Em Off Somethin' Proper
 "So Ruff, So Tuff" by Roger Troutman
 "Stay" by Jodeci
 "Check the Rhime" by A Tribe Called Quest
Don't Fight the Feelin'
 "Person to Person" by Average White Band
Don't Stop
 "Funkin' for Jamaica (N.Y.)" by Tom Browne
 "Der Kommissar" by Falco
 "Atomic Dog" by George Clinton
 "La Di Da Di" by Doug E. Fresh
It's All Good
 "Dusic" by Brick
 "Hobo Scratch" by Malcolm McLaren
Oaktown
 "More Bounce to the Ounce" by Zapp
 "Get It Up" by The Time
Pumps and a Bump
 "Atomic Dog" by George Clinton
Somethin' for the O.G.'s
 "Atomic Dog" by George Clinton

Personnel
Adapted from the liner notes of The Funky Headhunter.

 Wilton Rabb – guitar (tracks 8, 11–14)
 Ben Ross – bass (track 14)
 Eddy Schreyer – mastering (Future Disc, Los Angeles)
 Nancie Stern, Mary-Jo Braun – sample clearance assistance (Music Resources)
 Kevin Design Hosmann – art direction
 Michael Miller – photography
 Madame Mack Style – stylist

Certifications

References

1994 albums
MC Hammer albums
Giant Records (Warner) albums
RCA Records albums
G-funk albums
Hardcore hip hop albums
Albums produced by Teddy Riley